The Outer Harbor railway line is a suburban branch line in Adelaide, South Australia. It runs from Adelaide station through the north western suburbs to Port Adelaide and Outer Harbor. It is operated by Adelaide Metro.

Since 2016, the line has been used as a shuttle for cruise liner passengers heading for Adelaide, with additional services provided.

History
Opening in 1856, the inaugural  railway between Adelaide and Port Dock railway station was the second railway in the colony of South Australia, and the first government-owned railway in the British Empire. Port Adelaide junction was created when the railway was extended to cross the Port River to Le Fevre Peninsula. As industry developed on the west side of the Port River, and deeper harbour was required. Initially, this was at Semaphore, with the railway extended in 1882 as the now-closed Semaphore railway line to service the overseas shipping jetty there. The line was subsequently extended  to Outer Harbor.

21st century renewal 

The line between Port Adelaide Junction and Glanville was dual gauge until early December 2009 when the standard gauge rails were removed. Outer Harbor had a balloon loop railway so that trains could be turned around without shunting or requiring a turntable or triangle. The loop was cut when rail freight moved off the broad gauge Outer Harbor railway to the nearby standard gauge line on the eastern side of the peninsula.

Various plans to modify the line have been proposed. In 2008, the State Government announced a plan to rebuild the Outer Harbour line in preparation for the line to be electrified with the Federal Government also to provide funding. In the 2011 budget, it was announced that electrification of the Outer Harbor line had been deferred until 2016. In June 2012, the project was cancelled.

In May 2016, the State Government announced  of the line would be lowered in a grade separation project to pass below the Adelaide to Port Augusta and Gawler lines with a new Bowden station being built as part of the project. In December 2016 the contract was awarded to a consortium of Laing O'Rourke, AECOM and KBR.

As of 2016, the State Government was again considering electrifying the line or converting it to light rail. A 2016 report into potential light rail projects in Adelaide considered two options for the future of the line. The first option would electrify the heavy rail line and provide a short spur-line to central Port Adelaide. The second option would convert the line to light rail and add a new on-street branch to Semaphore. A light rail conversion would also require the conversion or closure of the Grange line - several options for the future of that line were also presented. In 2017, there had also been a proposal by the state government for a spur line into Port Adelaide, which did not go ahead.

In January 2017, the line was closed for three weeks alongside the Grange line for the building of an overpass over South Road and the North–South Motorway.

Torrens Junction separation
There are a total of five railway tracks on three bridges in parallel across the River Torrens. North of this bridge, the two tracks of the Gawler railway line continues north, as does the standard gauge railway track, while the two tracks of the Outer Harbor line swing away northwest. Until late 2017, the Outer Harbor tracks were the pair between the Gawler tracks on the east and the standard gauge track which was built in 1982 on the west. This meant that Outer Harbor and Grange trains had to cross the track that carries rail freight between Melbourne and the main freight terminals in Adelaide, Perth and Darwin. In 2017, the Torrens Junction project worked to remove this operational conflict. The outcome was to make the Gawler trains use the central pair of tracks, while the Outer Harbor line now uses the eastern pair across the bridge, then descends into a trench and passes underneath the Gawler and standard gauge lines and Park Terrace which had previously been a busy level crossing. The Bowden railway station was also demolished and rebuilt at a new lower level.

The Outer Harbor line was closed (and consequently also Grange services) along with a portion of the Gawler line in April, June, July, and August 2017 to work on the Torrens Rail Junction Project. The entire line was closed on 24 September 2017, and reopened on 15 January 2018, having been delayed from a 3 December opening.

Route
The line is double track from Adelaide to Midlunga, then single for the final three kilometres to Outer Harbour. The northern section of the line runs along the middle of the narrow Lefevre Peninsula with stations at regular intervals. The line's services are operated by 3000 class railcars.

Line guide

Services
The Outer Harbor line shares part of its route with the Grange line. All passenger train services are operated by 3000/3100 class railcars. Trains run every 30 minutes between 5am and 9pm on weekdays and weekends. Until 21 April 2018, trains ran on an hourly schedule after 9pm. There are no frequent express services on the line, with the only exception being the Osborne service which runs express from Adelaide to Woodville then all stations to Osborne during peak periods only. Starting from 27 January 2019, Adelaide metro released a new service time table for the Outer Harbor & Grange Line. The new schedule provides more services after 9 pm, from hourly services to half-hourly for the Outer harbor line, while remaining the hourly service for the Grange line.

The 2019 released timetable also offers peak time express and direct travel for the line users.

Outer Harbor/Grange to Adelaide 
During the morning peak time, a few additional services are provided on the Outer harbor line:  additional four services are offered between Glanville and Adelaide, stop at all stations in between; three express services from Osborne, stop at all stations until Woodville then express to Adelaide. While these additional services are offered during the peak hours on weekdays, service between Outer Harbour and Adelaide stopping at all stations transform into an express service, stopping at all stations between Outer Harbor and Port Adelaide, then express to the Adelaide Railway Station.

Similar to the morning peak time, four additional services are offered from Osborne to Adelaide, stopping at all stations between Osborne and Woodville then express to Adelaide.

Adelaide to Outer Harbor/Grange 
There will be four direct services from Adelaide to Glanville each morning during the morning peak hour on the weekday timetable.

Three additional services from Adelaide to Osborne are also available for the passengers to choose from, and each service skips the stop between Adelaide and Woodville. In contrast, the regular Outer Harbor services and the Grange services cover the missed stops from the express services.

Four additional services are provided on the Outer Harbor line between Adelaide and Osborne during the workday evening peak hour, similar to the morning peak hour; all evening express skip the stops between Adelaide and Woodville.

Both directions 
The Outer Harbor line remains a half-hourly timetable during the weekend and public holidays, while the Grange line remains an hourly time table. Additional services will be provided when there are special activities is being held at the Adelaide Oval.

References

External links 
 Outer Harbor to City - Adelaide Metro

Railway lines in South Australia
Railway lines opened in 1908
Transport in Adelaide
1908 establishments in Australia